Congregate  may refer to:

 Congregating the Sick, 2005 album by Swedish band Ribspreader
 Gathering place, a location where people gather or congregate
 Kongregate, game aggregation website
 Congregate, verb: to come together, to assemble, to gather together.

See also
 Congregation (disambiguation)